National Institute of Management (NIM), formerly known as National Institute of Public Administration (NIPA), is a constituent unit of National School of Public Policy (NSPP) and was established to impart training for Civil Servants of Pakistan.

History
It was established as National Institute of Public Administration (NIPA) in 1961 as an autonomous government organization.

In 2002, it was renamed and restructured as National Institute of Management and became part newly established National School of Public Policy.

Campuses
 Islamabad
 Karachi
 Lahore
 Peshawar
 Quetta

References

Public administration schools in Pakistan
1961 establishments in Pakistan